Werner Fricker (January 24, 1936, in Karlsdorf, Yugoslavia; (Banatski Karlovac); – May 30, 2001, in Horsham, Pennsylvania) was a German-American soccer halfback who later became president of the United States Soccer Federation.  He is a member of both the National Soccer Hall of Fame and the USASA Hall of Fame.

Player
Fricker was born to a German-speaking family in Southern Banat, Yugoslavia but his family were forced to abandon the home during the national upheaval at the end of World War II. His family arrived in the United States in 1952 and settled in the Philadelphia area where Werner started to play soccer for the German Hungarians in 1954. He had been selected for the United Soccer League all-star team several seasons and was a member of the 1964 U.S. Olympic team. He spent most of his career with the United German-Hungarians of Philadelphia. He was the captain of the German Hungarians, as well as the president of the GH, and of the United Soccer league. While playing for the GH Werner's team  won the championship of the USLofPA 6 times in a row (GH Majors 1961–1966), as well as in 1968, and 1969. Werner was captain and league delegate of the team. In 1964 the GH made it to the final of the Amateur Cup and lost to Chicago Schwaben, in Chicago. In 1965, Fricker and his teammates won the National Amateur Cup.

Werner was known as a "splitter" who was always tough in the man-to-man fight for the ball, but at the same time was always fair in his interferences. He was known to work tirelessly. His long passes were characterized as precise, and he never hesitated to take a shot at the opposing goal at any given opportunity. Werner took his soccer seriously and was a great believer in training sessions and team discipline.

Philadelphia United German-Hungarians
Werner began playing for the GH in 1954, and played continuously until 1969. He started playing in the reserves but was transferred to the Major Team a few seasons later. Werner was named captain  of the Major Team in 1958 and held this position until 1968. While playing for the GH Werner's team  won the Championship of the USLofPA 6 times in a row (GH Majors 1961–1966), as well as in 1968, and 1969. In 1964 the GH made it to the final of the Amateur Cup and lost to Chicago Schwaben, in Chicago. In 1965, Fricker and his teammates won the National Amateur Cup.More information about the 1965 Final can be found here GH 1965 Championship. The German Hungarians were Eastern Champions  three times during Werner's career with them (1964, 1965, 1966), U.S. National Amateur Finalists twice (1964, 1966), as well as Eastern Pennsylvania Champions for eight seasons. Werner coached for the GH, coaching the U-14 Team, the Reserve Team, as well as the Major Team. Werner was the secretary of the GH from 1962 to 1966. He was the president of the club from 1968 to 1976. Werner held almost every position within the GH organization. He was part of the Dance group, He served as the entertainment chairman, on the Constitution committee, the building committee, he was the Kirchweih chairman, and the chairman of the board. "There has been no one in almost fifty years club history who has had more impact, who has contributed more in all aspects, and has dedicated his efforts both financially and through leadership for our well being as a club than Werner Fricker" – Werner Fricker, Jr., Past President German Hungarians

United States men's national soccer team
In 1963 Werner was selected as an alternate for the U.S. Olympic Team that would play in the Pan American Games. Werner continued to be in the U.S. player pool until 1967. In 1963 Werner was the first Philadelphian to represent Olympic soccer since 1956, and was believed to be 4th ever, behind Jack Dunn, Walter Bahr, and Ray Wilson.

United Soccer League of Pennsylvania
In 1959 United Soccer League of Pennsylvania was formed with the German Hungarians as a founding member. German Hungarian, Frank Follmer became the first president of the new league. Over their years of involvement in the USLofPA many members of the German Hungarians have been involved in the running of the league. As a player, he had been selected for the United Soccer League All start team numerous times. He played for the allstar team from 1958 to 1968, and served as captain from 1963 to 1968. Werner also coached the Leagues U-16 Select Team.

Executive
Fricker was president of the United States Soccer Federation from 1984 to 1990, executive vice president from 1975 to 1984, and vice president from 1974 to 1975.  It was during Fricker's tenure as president of U.S. Soccer that the United States was awarded the right to host the 1994 World Cup, an event that significantly advanced the popularity of soccer in the United States. Fricker was defeated for re-election by Alan Rothenberg in 1990.

During his time serving in the U.S. administrative structure, Fricker also sat on the CONCACAF executive committee.

Werner Fricker was a founder of the USLofPA. He served as president of the USLofPA from 1970 to 1972, and secretary from 1967 to 1970.

Soccer experience
 Playing:
 United States Olympic Team – 1964
 United Soccer League of Pennsylvania
All Star Team 1958–1968
Captain 1963–1968
 Philadelphia United German-Hungarians 1954–1969
Captain 1958–1969
U.S. National Amateur Cup Champions – 1965
U.S. National Amateur Cup Finalists – 1964 & 1966
Eastern Champions – 1964 & 1966
 United Soccer League Champions – Eight Seasons
 Eastern Pennsylvania Champions – Eight Seasons
 Coaching:
 United Soccer League of Pennsylvania
U-16 Select Team
 Philadelphia United German-Hungarians
U-14 Team
Reserve Team
Major Team
 Administration:
 United States Soccer Federation
Executive Vice President 1975–1984
Vice President 1974–1975
President 1984–1990
 USSF Committee Chairman
1986 World Cup Organizing Committee
International Games Committee
Technical Committee
Restructuring Committee
Marketing Committee
Geographical Delineating Committee
 Eastern Pennsylvania Soccer Association
President 1972–1974
 United Soccer League of Pennsylvania
President 1970–1972
Secretary 1967–1970
 Philadelphia United German-Hungarians
President 1968–1976
Secretary 1962–1966

References

External links
 USASA Hall of Fame bio

1936 births
2001 deaths
People from Alibunar
Yugoslav emigrants to the United States
American soccer players
National Soccer Hall of Fame members
Presidents of the United States Soccer Federation
United States men's international soccer players
Association football midfielders